The College of Princess AA Obolensky (Гимназия княгини А. А. Оболенской) was a girls' school in St Petersburg in Russia between 1870 and 1918. It was a secondary education school founded by princess Alexandra Alekseevna Obolensky with the purpose of giving girls the level of education necessary to attend university courses. It was as such a pioneer institution in Russia and the second of its kind.

References
 Оболенский В. А. Моя жизнь. Мои современники. Париж: YMCA-PRESS. 1988. c. 20 — 24.

1870 establishments in the Russian Empire
1918 disestablishments in Russia
Educational institutions established in 1870
Educational institutions disestablished in 1918
19th century in Saint Petersburg
Schools in Saint Petersburg
Girls' schools in Russia
Cultural heritage monuments in Saint Petersburg